The 2014 Memorial Cup was a four-team, round-robin format tournament played from May 16–25, 2014 in London, Ontario. It was the 96th Memorial Cup championship and determined the champion of the Canadian Hockey League (CHL).  The tournament featured the Guelph Storm, champions of the Ontario Hockey League; the Val-d'Or Foreurs, champions of the Quebec Major Junior Hockey League; the Edmonton Oil Kings, champions of the Western Hockey League; and the London Knights, who won the right to host the tournament over bids by the Barrie Colts and the Windsor Spitfires.  London last hosted the Memorial Cup in 2005.

The semi-final match on May 23 between Val-d'Or and Edmonton was, at 102 minutes and 42 seconds, the longest game in Memorial Cup history and to date is the only game to go into triple overtime.

Edmonton defeated Guelph 6–3 on May 25 to win the Memorial Cup. The victory was the first Memorial Cup for the Western Hockey League since the Spokane Chiefs won the Memorial Cup in 2008. Guelph became the first team since the Sault Ste. Marie Greyhounds in 1992 to lose the final after going 3–0 in the round robin.

Round-robin standings

Schedule
All times local (UTC −5)

Round robin

Playoff round

Semi-final

Final

Statistical leaders

Skaters

GP = Games played; G = Goals; A = Assists; Pts = Points; PIM = Penalty minutes

Goaltending

This is a combined table of the top goaltenders based on goals against average and save percentage with at least sixty minutes played. The table is sorted by GAA.

GP = Games played; W = Wins; L = Losses; SA = Shots against; GA = Goals against; GAA = Goals against average; SV% = Save percentage; SO = Shutouts; TOI = Time on ice (minutes:seconds)

Awards
 Stafford Smythe Memorial Trophy (MVP): Edgars Kulda, Edmonton Oil Kings
 Ed Chynoweth Trophy (Leading Scorer): Henrik Samuelsson, Edmonton Oil Kings
 George Parsons Trophy (Sportsmanlike): Curtis Lazar, Edmonton Oil Kings
 Hap Emms Memorial Trophy (Top Goalie): Antoine Bibeau, Val-d'Or Foreurs
 All-Star Team:
Goaltender: Antoine Bibeau, Val-d'Or Foreurs
Defence: Cody Corbett (Edmonton Oil Kings), Matt Finn (Guelph Storm)
Forwards: Edgars Kulda (Edmonton Oil Kings), Kerby Rychel (Guelph Storm), Henrik Samuelsson (Edmonton Oil Kings)

Rosters

London Knights (Host)
Head coach: Dale Hunter

Guelph Storm (OHL)
Head coach: Scott Walker

Edmonton Oil Kings (WHL)
Head coach: Derek Laxdal

Val-d'Or Foreurs (QMJHL)

Head coach: Mario Durocher

Road to the Cup

WHL Playoffs

OHL Playoffs

QMJHL Playoffs

References

External links
 Memorial Cup
 Canadian Hockey League

Memorial Cup tournaments
Memorial Cup
Memorial Cup